Pedro Tiangco Tuason was a prominent Filipino lawyer and government official. Born in Balanga, Bataan on 15 September 1884 to Clemente Tuason and Josefa Tiangco, Tuason attended the public school in his town and at an escuela de segunda ensenanza. He was sent to study in the United States as a government pensionado, attending the New Jersey State Normal School in Trenton, then the Georgetown University Law School in Washington, D.C., where he graduated with the Bachelor of Laws degree in 1908, and finally the Yale Law School where he took a post graduate course. ("Justices of the Supreme Court", vol.2; pp. 57–61.) His name is sometimes wrongly spelled with the letter "z", such as the small stretch of a street named after him, but court decisions commonly use his original birth spelling.

Having passed the bar examinations in 1912, he was appointed Provincial Fiscal of Misamis, Surigao, Agusan (now Agusan del Norte and del Sur), and Ilocos Sur. He became assistant attorney in the Bureau of Justice in 1918 and, in 1921, occupied the Office of the Attorney General in an acting capacity. He again served as an assistant attorney of the Bureau of Justice from 1921 to 1922. From 1922 until 1936, he was successively judge of the Courts of First Instance of Albay, both Camarines Norte and Camarines Sur, Tayabas, Rizal, and Branch I of Manila. ("Justices of the Supreme Court", vol.2; pp. 57–61.) He became the Solicitor General in 1936, serving until 1938 when he was appointed associate justice of the Court of Appeals. In 1946, he was appointed Associate Justice of the Supreme Court, and after retirement he was rehired by the government to serve the Department of Justice for a few years. He died on June 28, 1961.

References
 http://osg.gov.ph/index.php/-assistant-sollicitors-general/fsolgens/109-pedro-t-tuazon

1884 births
1961 deaths
20th-century Filipino judges
People from Balanga, Bataan
Associate Justices of the Supreme Court of the Philippines
Solicitors General of the Philippines
Justices of the Court of Appeals of the Philippines
Secretaries of Justice of the Philippines
Magsaysay administration cabinet members
Garcia administration cabinet members